Achacy Grochowski (died 1633) was a Polish bishop of Przemyśl (1624–1627) and bishop of Łuck (1627–1633).

16th-century births
1633 deaths
Roman Catholic bishops of Przemyśl